Laurent Merchiers (9 June 1904 – 5 February 1986) was a Belgian liberal politician, lawyer, and a professor at the University of Ghent.

He was mayor of Ghent in a liberal-socialist coalition from 1953 to 1958. Laurent Merchiers was a member of parliament and senator (1955–1971), and minister of justice (1958–1960). He resigned as a minister after the Congo crisis.

Sources
 Laurent Merchiers (Liberal archive)

1904 births
1986 deaths
Flemish politicians
People from Zottegem
Academic staff of Ghent University
Mayors of Ghent